Bells University of Technology (BUT), also known as Bellstech, is the first private university of technology established in Nigeria. It was established in 2004, and began admitting students from the 2005/2006 academic session. It is located in Ogun State of Nigeria.

History
Bellstech was established in 2004 by The Bells Educational Foundation, which already ran Nursery, Primary and Secondary schools. The Bells Educational Foundation is owned by an egg

Colleges and departments
BUT is made up of seven Colleges and thirty-five Departments. Due to restructuring some colleges were merged and from 1 August 2016 BUT has three Colleges: College of Engineering & Environmental Sciences, College of Natural & Applied Sciences and College of Management Sciences.

College of Natural and Applied Sciences
 Physics with Electronics
 Applied Mathematics & Statistics
 Industrial Chemistry
 Biochemistry
 Chemistry
 Microbiology
 Aquaculture & Fisheries Mgt
 Marine Biology
 Computer Science 
 Information Technology

College of Food Sciences
 Food Science with Business Mgt
 Food Technology
 Biotechnology
 Nutrition and Dietetics

College of Information and Communications Technology
 Computer Science and Technology
 Information Technology

College of Management Sciences
 Business Administration with option in (Business Computing, Human Resources Management, International Business and Marketing)
 Project management
 Accounting
 Banking and finance
 Economics

College of Engineering 

 Mechanical Engineering
 Electrical/Electronics Engineering
 Mechatronics Engineering
 Biomedical Engineering
 Computer Engineering
 Telecommunications Engineering

See also
Academic libraries in Nigeria

References 

Universities and colleges in Nigeria
Educational institutions established in 2004
2004 establishments in Nigeria
Education in Ogun State
Private universities and colleges in Nigeria
Academic libraries in Nigeria